Yusufiyah (also transliterated as Yusafiyah, Youssifiyah or Yusifiyah, occasionally prefixed with Al-) is a regional township in the Baghdad Governorate of Iraq.

Background
Yusufiyah is named after Yūsuf (Joseph). A major canal, known as the Yusufiyah canal, runs from Sadr al Yusufiyah in the west, through Yusufiyah, and south to Latifiyah.

Yusufiyah has a population of 130,176, most living in the city centre.

The Yusufiyah area is primarily located on the east side of Euphrates river, of which the Yusufiyah canal is a branch. This area has two archaeological locations called Aldear and Abu Haba. These locations formed part of the defensive borders of Akkad (2000 B.C.) and the ancient name of Yusufiyah is Sippar.

Architecture
The town of Yusufiyah has around one hundred buildings, with less than ten buildings that are over five stories tall. There are at least three mosques within Yusufiyah itself, and at least one in each nearby village. The vast majority of buildings in Yusufiyah are one or two-story brick and cement structures with shops on the first floor and apartments on the second or third floors.

Demographics
The populace in the villages of Yusufiyah are mostly Sunni (about 58%), while about 99.9% of those living in the city centre are of one of the three major Shia tribes. Agriculture is the main form of employment, with some retail and industrial shops within the town itself. Those Sunni and Shia tribes have rooted family connections.

Iraq War

The city was part of a group of cities of Mahmudiya District including Yusufiyah, Mahmoudiyah, Iskandariyah and Latifiyah that was later referred to as Triangle of Death.

See also
 Triangle of Death (Iraq)

References

Populated places in Baghdad Province